Bo Diddley is a song written by Lasse Holm and Gert Lengstrand, and performed by Arvingarna at Melodifestivalen 1995, who ended up placing sixth in the competition.

At the Swedish singles chart, it peaked at number 21. The song also charted at Svensktoppen for 12 weeks between 18 March-3 June 1995, peaking at number two.

Charts

References

External links
 Information at Svensk mediedatabas

1995 singles
1995 songs
Arvingarna songs
Melodifestivalen songs of 1995
Songs written by Lasse Holm
Swedish-language songs
Songs written by Gert Lengstrand